Receptor tyrosine-protein kinase erbB-4 is an enzyme that in humans is encoded by the ERBB4 gene. Alternatively spliced variants that encode different protein isoforms have been described; however, not all variants have been fully characterized.

Function 

Receptor tyrosine-protein kinase erbB-4 is a receptor tyrosine kinase that is a member of the epidermal growth factor receptor family. ERBB4 is a single-pass type I transmembrane protein with multiple furin-like cysteine rich domains, a tyrosine kinase domain, a phosphotidylinositol-3 kinase binding site and a PDZ domain binding motif. The protein binds to and is activated by neuregulins-2, -3 and -4, heparin-binding EGF-like growth factor and betacellulin.  Ligand binding induces a variety of cellular responses including mitogenesis and differentiation. Multiple proteolytic events allow for the release of a cytoplasmic fragment and an extracellular fragment.

Clinical significance 

Mutations in this gene have been associated with cancer. Other single-nucleotide polymorphisms and a risk haplotype have been linked to schizophrenia. Single-nucleotide polymorphisms in ERBB4 have also been found in a study of patients with familial amyotrophic lateral sclerosis type 19.

Interactions 

ERBB4 has been shown to interact with:
 DLG4
 NRG1,
 STAT5A, and
 YAP1.

References

Further reading

External links 
 

Tyrosine kinase receptors